Acrolophus cossoides is a moth of the family Acrolophidae. It is found in Brazil.

References

cossoides
Moths described in 1875